The 1995 NCAA Division I softball season, play of college softball in the United States organized by the National Collegiate Athletic Association (NCAA) at the Division I level, began in February 1995.  The season progressed through the regular season, many conference tournaments and championship series, and concluded with the 1995 NCAA Division I softball tournament and 1995 Women's College World Series.  The Women's College World Series, consisting of the eight remaining teams in the NCAA Tournament and held in Oklahoma City at ASA Hall of Fame Stadium, ended on May 29, 1995.

Conference standings

Women's College World Series
The 1995 NCAA Women's College World Series took place from May 23 to May 26, 1995 in Oklahoma City.

Season leaders
Batting
Batting average: .518 - Jennifer Brundage, UCLA Bruins
RBIs: 128 – Laura Espinoza, Arizona Wildcats
Home runs: 37 – Laura Espinoza, Arizona Wildcats

Pitching
Wins: 33-3 – Carrie Dolan, Arizona Wildcats
ERA: 0.50 (9 ER/126.0 IP) - Tanya Harding, UCLA Bruins
Strikeouts: 367, Trinity Johnson, South Carolina Gamecocks

Records
NCAA Division I season runs:
101 – Jenny Dalton, Arizona Wildcats

NCAA Division I season RBIs:
128 – Laura Espinoza, Arizona Wildcats

NCAA Division I season home runs:
37 – Laura Espinoza, Arizona Wildcats

NCAA Division I season total bases:
232 – Laura Espinoza, Arizona Wildcats

NCAA Division I single game RBIs:
11 – Tiffany Whittall, Louisiana Ragin' Cajuns; April 15, 1995

NCAA Division I single game SINGLE GAME runs:
7 – Ellen Burns, Michelle Lafomara & Stephanie Riggins, Cornell Big Red; March 19, 1995

Sophomore class single game hits:
7 – Michelle Lafomara, Cornell Big Red; March 19, 1995

Sophomore class consecutive games hit streak:
35 – Robyn Yorke, Fresno State Bulldogs; February 12-April 1, 1995

Sophomore class hits:
114 – Robyn Yorke, Fresno State Bulldogs

Sophomore class triples:
16 – Jennifer Egan, Monmouth Hawks

Team hits:
765 – Arizona Wildcats

Team RBIs:
566 – Arizona Wildcats

Team triples:
47 – Monmouth Hawks

Awards
Honda Sports Award Softball:
Jennifer Brundage, UCLA Bruins

All America Teams
The following players were members of the All-American Teams.

First Team

Second Team

Third Team

References